Seonimgyo Bridge is an arch bridge on Jeju Island over Cheonjeyeon Waterfall that has seven nymphs carved on both sides. It crosses from east to west over the stream between the second and third tiers of Cheonjeyeon waterfall. The bridge is also called Chilseonyeogyo (칠선녀교) or Seven Nymphs Bridge. The nymphs symbolize the Korean legend of the descent of seven beautiful nymphs from heaven at night. Seonimgyo Bridge is the first bridge with Ojakgyo (오작교) design in the region. It was completed in 1984, and cost the Korea Tourism Organization about 400 million won to construct. There is a fee for tourists who use the bridge. There are 100 guard rails and 34 stone lanterns which light up at night. On the bridge's steel columns, there are 14 nymphs, 7 on each side with each nymph about 20 m in length. All the nymphs are playing their own musical instruments.

It is a tourist attraction on Jeju-do. The bridge connects Cheonjeyeon with the Jungmun Tourist Complex, and is intended for pedestrian use.

References

Buildings and structures in Jeju Province
Bridges in South Korea
Bridges completed in 1984
Footbridges